"Afrikaners Landgenote" or "Afrikaners Landgenoten" is a South African Afrikaner folk song. It is set to the tune of "Deutschlandlied" and "Gott erhalte Franz den Kaiser". it  is a translation of Deutschlandlied, It was written by Nico Hofmeyer and was intended as an alternative Afrikaans-language national anthem for South Africa alongside "God Save the King" before "Die Stem van Suid-Afrika".

History 
Following the creation of the Union of South Africa, Afrikaners objected to "God Save the King" being the only official anthem of South Africa. However they had no desire to restore the old anthems of the former Boer Republics. Accordingly, the Genootskap van Regte Afrikaners held a contest to create an Afrikaans-language national anthem. "Afrikaners Landgenote" was proposed for the contest, and though another song titled "Waar Tafelberg begin" (English: Where Table Mountain begins) received initial support, the society decided to go with "Afrikaners Landgenote" to propose as the Afrikaans co-national anthem. Though this campaign failed with "Die Stem van Suid-Afrika" being selected as the co-national anthem in 1938, "Afrikaners Langenote" became popular as an unofficial national anthem.

The song remained popular as an Afrikaans folk song and was sung prior to the State President of South Africa F. W. de Klerk announcing the end of apartheid in the Parliament of South Africa.

Analysis 
The first verse focused on Afrikaners being loyal to South Africa and to the Afrikaans language. The second verse affirms loyalty to the Afrikaans language first as part of Afrikaner culture though also looks at Afrikaner women. The last verse is equivalent to the current German "Deutschlandlied" anthem, calling for "unity, freedom and justice" in South Africa.

References 

Afrikaner culture
South African folk songs
Afrikaans